Deilephila elpenor, the elephant hawk moth or large elephant hawk moth, is a moth in the family Sphingidae. Its common name is derived from the caterpillar's resemblance to an elephant's trunk. It is most common in central Europe and is distributed throughout the Palearctic region. It has also been introduced in British Columbia, Canada. Its distinct olive and pink colouring makes it one of the most recognisable moths in its range. However, it is quite easy to confuse the elephant hawk moth with the small elephant hawk moth, a closely related species that also shares the characteristic colours.

These moths are nocturnal and therefore feed on flowers that open or produce nectar at nighttime. The elephant hawk moth has very sensitive eyes that allow it to see colour even at low-light, and it was one of the first species in which nocturnal colour vision was documented in animals. The moth is also known for its hovering capability, which it utilises when feeding on nectar from flowers. This behaviour is costly in terms of energy and can help explain why the moth has evolved such enhanced visual capabilities for efficient feeding. The moths also have an important role as pollinators throughout their habitat.

Description 
The D. elpenor moth has olive-brown coloured forewings outlined with pink. Two pink lines also run through the wings. The first line is usually thicker and terminates in the center of the wings near a white dot. The second line, which runs below the first, starts at the white inner margins and runs until the tip of the wing. The hindwings have a black inner half that gradually turns pink from the middle outwards. It is outlined by white fringes. The head, thorax, and body are also olive-brown in colour with pink markings throughout.

Subspecies
Two separate subspecies, Deilephila elpenor elpenor and Deilephila elpenor lewisii, were recognised in the past, but they are no longer regarded as well-distinguished. Similarly, the subspecies Deilephila elpenor szechuana is now thought to be a synonym for Deilephila elpenor elpenor. The subspecies Deilephila elpenor macromera, found in southern China, northern India, Bhutan and Myanmar, is still regarded as distinct.

Similar species 
The elephant hawk moth is often confused with the small elephant hawk moth (Deilephila porcellus). There are clear distinctions in size and colouring that can help differentiate between the two. As the name suggests, the small elephant hawk moth is much smaller. It is also more yellow in colour around its body. The most obvious defining feature is the thick pink stripe going down the elephant hawk moth's abdomen that is missing on the small elephant hawk moth's abdomen.  The two species are not usually seen together in garden traps because the small elephant hawk moth prefers more open habitats.

Range
D. elpenor is very common in central Europe and has a distribution throughout the palearctic region. The species is especially well-distributed in England, Wales, and Ireland. Until the 1980s, D. elpenor was only present in the southern half of Scotland, but now it has made its way up the north coast and into the country's mainland as well. In general, the moth's range becomes thinner and less concentrated in the northern parts of Europe. The range also extends throughout Asia and even to Japan.

Habitat 
D. elpenor inhabits a variety of habitats. These include rough grassland, heathland, sand dunes, hedgerows, woodland, the open countryside, and even urban gardens. The moths play an important role in pollination throughout their habitats. For example, previous studies on hawk moths have indicated that they can pollinate up to 5–10% of the tree and shrub species in the area they inhabit.

Life cycle 
There is usually only a single generation of D. elpenor in a given year. Occasionally, a small number of second generation individuals in a single year will be recorded in the late summer, but this is very rare. The pupae overwinter in cocoons, and the species become active from May to early August. Its peak activity time is between the midsummer months of June and September.

Egg 
The females lay eggs either singly or in pairs on the leaves of plants that can act as food sources to the caterpillars when they emerge. These include but are not limited to rosebay willowherb (Chamaenerion angustifolium) and bedstraws (of the genus Galium). The moths are also attracted to gardens, and eggs have frequently been found on garden fuchsias, dahlias, and lavender. The eggs are whitish-green and have a glossy texture. Eggs will usually hatch in ten days.

Larva

Young larvae are a yellowish white to green colour. When they have finished growing, the larvae are a brown-gray colour with black dots along the length of the body. Larvae have a backward curving spine or "horn" that is the same colour as their body on the final abdominal segment. Fully grown larvae can measure up to 3 inches (7.62 cm) in length.

Variation in colour has been observed in nature. Specifically, a green version of the full-grown larva exists within the species. Previous research has shown that the colour variation is not due to a simple inheritance pattern, and specific explanations still remain inconclusive.

Pupa 

It takes around 27 days for D. elpenor to move from the larva stage to the pupa stage. When the larvae are fully grown, they will look for a place to pupate. Usually, this ends up being at the base of a plant in plant debris or underneath the surface of the ground. Once they have found a secure spot, they will line the pupal chamber with a few strands of silk, pupate, then overwinter as pupae. Their pupae are brown with darker brown speckles throughout, and the divisions between the segments appear black. Pupae are 40–45 mm long.

Adult
The wingspan of D. elpenor that have been collected in Europe measure to be around 60–70 mm. There is also very little variation between the male and female D. elpenor. Adults are the most active during the month of June. They visit flowers and feed on the nectar at night, and are especially attracted to plants such as honeysuckles (Lonicera).

Adaptations

Eyespots 
Many Lepidoptera species have evolved eyespots either on their body (when they are caterpillars) or on their wings (as fully grown adults). This dark, circular marking is generally thought to resemble the eyes of a predator and deter attacks from birds that feed on insects. This mimicry is effective because the caterpillar is usually somewhat concealed, and because the predators must respond to the signals quickly.

When it feels threatened by a predator, the caterpillar will widen the anterior part of the body. This defensive posture emphasises the eyespots and makes it more conspicuous. Some research have suggested that this allows the eyespots of the caterpillar to resemble a snake more closely than it could when it is at rest.

Mating

Pheromones 
Experiments using gas chromatography and mass spectroscopy have identified (E)-11-hexadecenal and (10E, 12E)-10,12-hexadecadienal [(E,E)-bombykal] as the major components of the female sex pheromone. These pheromones are the most active when females are actively exhibiting calling behaviour and visibly showing their ovipositors.

Vision
D. elpenor have very sensitive eyes that allow them to have colour vision even at nighttime. Studies have analysed the dark-adapted eyes of D.elpenor and have found three visual pigments with a maximal wavelength of 345 nm, 440 nm, and 520 nm. These values respectively correspond to ultraviolet, blue, and green wavelengths. Most vertebrates, such as humans, lose the ability to use the three types of photoreceptors present in the eye in dim light conditions. However, all three types of photoreceptors remain functional in various light conditions for D. elpenor, giving it the ability to have scotopic colour vision. This species was the first instance in which being able to see colour at night was documented in animals. Usually, increased colour sensitivity results in decreases in spatial resolution. However, despite the great sensitivity of its eyesight, the moth also has a reasonable spatial resolution. This nighttime colour vision is necessary because of the moth's feeding patterns. D. elpenor feeds at the darkest hours of night and also hovers over the flower to suck its nectar out rather than sitting on the flower. Locating the correct flower and hovering over it are both visually demanding tasks.

Feeding 
D. elpenor feed on nectar from flowers. When most insects forage, they land on the flower to retrieve the nectar. However, D. elpenor hovers in front of the flower rather than landing on the flower itself. The moth then extends its long, straw-like proboscis to attain its food. While hovering, its wings beat at a high frequency to stabilise the body from the drift of the wind. This flight pattern is quite costly; therefore, it is important for the moth to be able to feed effectively by knowing where to find nectar.

Visual cues 
Since they are nocturnal, the moths tend to feed on flowers that open or produce nectar at twilight or during the night. These are commonly termed "hawkmoth flowers". D. elpenor are able to see colour, an ability that is usually absent from most other nocturnal species. Their particular visual system allows them to discriminate between various wavelengths even at low illumination, allowing the moths to find correct food sources while foraging.

Olfactory cues 
Olfaction also plays an important role in feeding for the moth. Many of the hawkmoth flowers contain a pleasant smell. Previous studies have found that fragrance release from the hawkmoth flowers stimulate flower-seeking behaviour by the moths. Therefore, it has been hypothesized that both visual and olfactory cues play a role in the feeding behaviour of D. elpenor.

Learning 
D. elpenor, like many other insects, can learn to adapt its behaviour to changing environmental conditions. Experiments with D. elpenor has shown that it can discriminate between various visual stimuli (i.e. colour) and associate it with a food reward. This behaviour is especially important because the wrong decision when choosing a food source can prove to be a costly mistake in terms of time and energy resources. The experiment was conducted through the use of differently coloured artificial flowers. When no reward in the form of nectar was given by the flower, the moth did not further participate in foraging behaviour with that particular flower. This demonstrated the moth's need to keep energy expenses as low as possible while foraging.

Flight 
Peak flight time for D. elpenor is between the months of June and September. Since the species is nocturnal, the moth will fly from dusk until the morning. Then it will rest at one of its food sources until dusk comes again. The moth has a maximum flight speed of 4.5— 5.1 m/s. The wind confers mechanical resistance to the wings while flying. Therefore, winds have negative effects on the energy budget of the moth. As a result, D. elpenor stop visiting flowers at wind speeds starting at 3.0 m/s.

D. elpenor are particularly adept at hovering, which is a necessary skill for obtaining nectar. It utilises spatial cues and motion-detecting neurons to steady itself.

Predators 
Some natural predators use bright colouring to attract its prey, which includes D. elpenor. The conspicuous body colouring of certain nocturnal invertebrates, such as the white forehead stripes on the brown huntsman spider, lures the flying moth to its predator.

Bats are also known to prey on the moth.

Gallery

References

External links

"69.016 BF1991 Elephant Hawk-moth Deilephila elpenor (Linnaeus, 1758)". UKMoths.
More images, UK Virtual Field Guide
Description in Richard South's The Moths of the British Isles
Lepiforum e.V.

Macroglossini
Moths described in 1758
Moths of Japan
Moths of Europe
Moths of North America
Moths of Asia
Taxa named by Carl Linnaeus
Articles containing video clips